Bucknell University is a private liberal arts college in Lewisburg, Pennsylvania. Founded in 1846 as the University at Lewisburg, it now consists of the College of Arts and Sciences, Freeman College of Management, and the College of Engineering. It offers 65 majors and over 70 minors in the humanities, arts, mathematics, natural science, social sciences, engineering, management, as well as programs and pre-professional advising that prepare students for study in law and medicine. Located just south of Lewisburg, the  campus rises above the West Branch of the Susquehanna River.

Approximately 3,700 undergraduate students and 50 graduate students attend the university. Students hail from all fifty U.S. states and more than 66 countries; it boasts nearly 200 student organizations and a sizable Greek life. The school is a member of the Patriot League in NCAA Division I athletics, and its mascot is the Bison.

History

Founding and Early Years
Founded in 1846 as the University at Lewisburg, Bucknell traces its origin to a group of Baptists from White Deer Valley Baptist Church who deemed it "desirable that a Literary Institution should be established in Central Pennsylvania, embracing a High School for male pupils, another for females, a College and also a Theological Institution."

The group's efforts for the institution began to crystallize in 1845, when Stephen William Taylor, a professor at Madison University (now Colgate University) in Hamilton, New York, was asked to prepare a charter and act as general agent for the development of the university. The charter for the University at Lewisburg, granted by the Pennsylvania General Assembly and approved by the governor on February 5, 1846, carried one stipulation–that $100,000 ($ today) be raised before the new institution would be granted full corporate status. More than 4,000 subscribers ultimately contributed, including a small boy who gave 12 cents ($ today).

In 1846, the "school preparatory to the University" opened in the basement of the First Baptist Church in Lewisburg. Known originally as the Lewisburg High School, it became in 1848 the Academic and Primary Department of the University at Lewisburg.

In 1850, the department moved into the first building completed on campus, now called Taylor Hall. Built for $8,000 ($ today), the building housed both women's and men's studies until the opening of the Female Institute in 1852. While studying together, women were required to face east while men faced west.

The school's first commencement was held on August 20, 1851, for a graduation class of seven men. Among the board members attending was James Buchanan, who would become the 15th President of the United States. Stephen Taylor officiated as his last act before assuming office as president of Madison University. One day earlier, the trustees had elected Howard Malcom as the first president of the university, a post he held for six years.

Female Institute

Although the Female Institute began instruction in 1852, it wasn't until 1883 that college courses were opened to women. Bucknell, though, was committed to equal educational opportunities for women.This commitment was reflected in the words of David Jayne Hill of the Class of 1874, and president of the college from 1879 to 1888: "We need in Pennsylvania, in the geographical centre of the state, a University, not in the German but in the American sense, where every branch of non-professional knowledge can be pursued, regardless of distinction of sex. I have no well-matured plan to announce as to the sexes; but the Principal of the Female Seminary proposes to inaugurate a course for females equal to that pursued at Vassar; the two sexes having equal advantages, though not reciting together." Within five years of opening, enrollment had grown so sharply that the college built a new hall–Larison Hall–to accommodate the Female Institute. Women could venture into town only in the company of a female teacher who had a minimum of six years' experience.

Benefactor William Bucknell
In 1881, facing dire financial circumstances, the college turned to William Bucknell, a charter member of the board of trustees, for help. His donation of $50,000 ($ today) saved the college from ruin. In 1886, in recognition of Bucknell's support of the college, the trustees voted unanimously to change the name of the University at Lewisburg to Bucknell University. Bucknell Hall, the first of several buildings given to the institution by Bucknell, was initially a chapel and for more than a half century the site of student theatrical and musical performances. Today, it houses the Stadler Center for Poetry.

Continued Expansion

The 40 years from 1890 until 1930 saw a steady increase in the number of faculty members and students. When the Depression brought a drop in enrollment in 1933, several members of the faculty were "loaned" to found a new institution: Bucknell Junior College in Wilkes-Barre, Pennsylvania. Today, that institution is a four-year university, Wilkes University, independent of Bucknell since 1947. The depression era also saw the commissioning by President Homer Rainey (1931–35) of architect Jens Larsen to design Bucknell's master plan. Subsequent expansion of the university still largely adheres to this plan.

The post-War period saw a dramatic increase in higher education enrollment across the United States, thanks first to the G.I. Bill and then to the baby boom. Like other institutions, Bucknell's campus grew to accommodate a growing student body, and the college broke ground on many of the academic buildings that comprise upper campus. Chief among these is the Ellen Clarke Bertrand Library, commissioned in 1946 under Bucknell President and former Governor of Maine Horace Hildreth and opened in 1951. Other major additions from the building spree of the 1950s and 60s include the Olin Science Building and Coleman, Marts, and Swartz Halls.

Building for the Future
A growing reputation and changing expectations for undergraduate education in the United States called for improved facilities. The 1970s brought construction of the Elaine Langone Center, the Gerhard Fieldhouse, and the Computer Center. In the 1980s, the capacity of Bertrand Library was doubled, facilities for engineering were substantially renovated, and the Weis Center for the Performing Arts was inaugurated.

Heading into the 21st century, new facilities for the sciences included the renovation of the Olin Science Building, the construction of the Rooke Chemistry Building in 1990 and a new Biology Building in 1991. The Weis Music Building was inaugurated in 2000, the O'Leary Building for Psychology and Geology opened in the fall of 2002, the new Kenneth Langone Recreational Athletic Center opened in 2003, and the Breakiron Engineering Building in 2004.

Academic West opened in fall 2013. It added  of academic space and houses mostly social science departments: economics, geography, international relations,  political science, sociology/anthropology, Critical Black Studies, Latin American Studies, and Environmental Studies and Sciences. The South Campus Apartment Buildings and MacDonnell Commons were opened in 2015, providing upperclassmen with apartment-style housing that offers a more independent residential experience. In 2018, Hildreth-Mirza Hall became the home to Bucknell's Center for the Humanities, Bucknell University Press, and the Griot Institute for the Study of Black Lives and Culture. Academic East was inaugurated in 2019 to house the Department of Education and programs in the College of Engineering. A new building housing the Freeman College of Management and the Department of Art and Art History opened in 2020.

Campus

Grounds

Bucknell's  campus comprises more than 100 buildings that range over a gentle rise adjacent to the West Branch Susquehanna River. The campus is divided into Lower Campus and Upper Campus by Miller Run and the Grove, a stand of oak trees that ascends the slope. Lower campus consists primarily of student housing and the institution's sports facilities. Upper campus consists primarily of academic buildings. It offers views northwest across the Buffalo Valley toward Nittany Mountain and southeast across the Susquehanna River toward Montour Ridge. Bucknell's campus forms a cohesive architectural ensemble due to the sustained use of brick and the recurrent themes of Georgian style. The institution's first building, Taylor Hall, was constructed in 1848. Its newest building, Holmes Hall, was inaugurated in 2021.

Non-Academic Facilities

Rooke Chapel is the non-denominational setting for campus worship, weddings, and celebrations. The chapel was a gift of Robert L. Rooke (class of 1913), a member of the board of trustees. The chapel is named in memory of Mr. Rooke's parents and inaugurated October 25, 1953. The main portion of the chapel includes the narthex, sanctuary, chancel area, organ chamber, choir rooms, and balconies that surround the sanctuary on three sides. The sanctuary can seat 850. Attached to the chapel is a one-story wing housing the Office of Religious Life, the Chaplain's office, and a meditation space. 

Christy Mathewson–Memorial Stadium is a 13,100-seat multi-purpose stadium built in 1924 and renovated in 1989 when it was also renamed in honor of Christy Mathewson (class of 1902) a New York Giants pitcher who was inducted into the Baseball Hall of Fame in 1932.  It is home to the Bucknell University Bison football team and the Lewisburg High School Green Dragons football team.

The Kenneth Langone Athletics and Recreation Center was completed in 2003. It houses a state-of-the-art fitness center,  Olympic-size swimming pool, and other athletic facilities. The 4,000-seat Sojka Pavilion, named for former college president Gary Allan Sojka, is home to the men's and women's basketball teams.

The Bucknell Farm was established in 2018, building on the success of the Lewisburg Community garden, a partnership between the university and the Borough of Lewisburg. The 5-acre organic farm overlooking Montour Ridge offers learning and service opportunities for students and provides fresh, local produce for the university's dining system. Along with a 1.76-megawatt solar array installed in 2022, the farm represents part of Bucknell's commitment to achieving carbon neutrality by 2030 and long-term environmental sustainability.

Academics

Bucknell has a total enrollment of around 3,700 undergraduate and 30 graduate students. With around 400 faculty, the faculty to student ratio is 9:1 with the average class size of approximately 20 students. Bucknell has traditionally had strong engineering programs. With the addition for the Freeman College of Management in 2015, Bucknell offers a distinctive balance of foundational liberal arts study and pre-professional training, a balance reflected in the 25% of students who choose to double major. In 2021, the largest majors according to the categories supplied by the National Center for Education Statistics were: Accounting and Finance (79 graduates), Political Science and Government (76 graduates), Economics (67 graduates), Psychology (66 graduates), Biology/Biological Sciences (60 graduates). In addition to coursework, many students take advantage of undergraduate research opportunities available across the three colleges. For the years between 2015 and 2021, 18% of students reported pursuing post-graduate study within 9 months of graduating.

College of Arts & Sciences

The College of Arts and Sciences anchors Bucknell University in the liberal arts tradition. Its three divisions—arts and humanities, social sciences, and natural sciences and mathematics—host 275 faculty members in 34 departments and 66% percent of all students enrolled in 50 majors.   The College Core Curriculum ensures that students receive a broad based, liberal education. The college emphasizes intellectual community in diversity; transformative education for the common good; mentorship that encourages students to lead examined lives; and leading-edge research and scholarship.

College of Engineering

Among American colleges that do not offer a PhD in engineering, Bucknell was ranked 6th for 2022, according to U.S. News & World Report. The same report ranked Computer Engineering 5th, Civil Engineering 5th, Electrical Engineering 2nd, and Mechanical Engineering 9th. Engineering facilities are concentrated in three buildings: The Charles A. Dana Engineering Building, the adjoining Breakiron Engineering Building, and Academic East (shared with the Education Department).

Freeman College of Management
Students can choose from five tracks leading to the BSBA degree: managing for sustainability, markets innovation and design, global management, accounting & financial management or analytics & operations management. A five-year, dual degree in Engineering and Management is available for engineers with management career goals. In 2022, after 4 years as an independent college, The Freeman College of Management was ranked 17th among undergraduate business schools.

Centers and Institutes
Bucknell hosts a variety of centers and institutes committed to the promotion of research and scholarship among faculty and students.

The Bucknell Humanities Center opened in 2017 with the inauguration of Hildreth-Mirza Hall. The center is committed to the promoting and deepening Bucknell's tradition of humanistic inquiry through grants for student research, faculty-student collaboration, and teaching; faculty and student fellowships; the coordination and conviviality among humanities faculty and students through the Humanities Council and Humanities Student Council; and space to gather, reflect, study, and research including offices for student thesis writers, a digital humanities lab, and a faculty-donated library. It also coordinates robust programming ranging from faculty colloquia and guest speakers to the student-organized Humanities Week and annual themed programming on a variety of topics: "Surrealism" (2018–19), "Antifascism" (2019–20), "Floods" (2020–21), "Non/Humanity" (2021-22), and "Pandemics" (2022–23).

The Bucknell Center for Sustainability and the Environment (BSCE) and closely related Center for Place Studies encourage faculty, student, and staff research on the environment through long-term relationships with community partners throughout the region. It hosts the annual River Symposium in the fall focused on the art, culture, and ecology of the Susquehanna River basin as well as an annual Sustainability Symposium in the spring.

The Geisinger-Bucknell Autism and Developmental Medicine Institute (ADMI) was formed in April, 2013 as a partnership between Bucknell and the Geisinger Health System, headquartered in nearby Danville. This facility combines clinical treatment and interdisciplinary research on neurodevelopmental disorders.

Other centers and institutes include: the Bucknell Institute for Lifelong Learning, the Bucknell Institute for Public Policy, the Center for Social Science Research, the Center for the Study of Race Ethnicity and Gender, the China Institute, the Griot Institute for the Study of Black Lives and Cultures, the Stadler Center for Poetry and Literary Arts, and the Weis Center for the Performing Arts.

Study Abroad
Fifty percent of Bucknell students study abroad. The institution sponsors semester-long programs in Accra, Athens, Tours, London, and Granada, as well as short-term programs in Barbados, Denmark, Nicaragua, South Africa, and other sites around the world. In addition, students have the opportunity to engage in direct exchanges with universities in Hong Kong, Accra, and Nottingham as well as hundreds of approved exchanges facilitated by third parties.

Rankings

In the 2022 edition of U.S. News & World Report, Bucknell tied for 37th in the "National Liberal Arts Colleges" category.  The 2022 edition of the Wall Street Journal/Times Higher Education U.S. College Rankings placed Bucknell 81st among U.S. universities. In 2022, Forbes rated Bucknell 89th in its list of "America's Top Colleges". In 2022, Washington Monthly, which ranks colleges and universities based on perceived contribution to the public good as measured by social mobility, research, and promoting public service, ranked Bucknell 33rd among liberal arts colleges. In 2022, Payscale "College Salary Report" ranked Bucknell 28th among all colleges and universities and 12th among liberal arts colleges for salary potential. Bucknell is considered one of the "Hidden Ivies," an institution reputed to provide an education comparable to that of Ivy League institutions.

Admissions
U.S. News & World Report classifies Bucknell's selectivity as "more selective." For the Class of 2026 (enrolled Fall 2022), Bucknell received 11,708 applications and accepted 3,812 (32.6%), with 1,047 enrolling (27.5% yield rate).  The middle 50% range of SAT scores for the enrolled freshmen was 650–730 for reading and writing, and 660–770 for math, while the ACT middle 50% composite range was 29–33. Beginning in 2022, Bucknell like most of its peer institutions is now test optional, meaning applicants can choose whether or not to submit SAT and ACT scores when applying. The average high school grade point average (GPA) for enrolled freshmen the class of 2026 was 3.75.

Athletics

Bucknell is a member of the Patriot League for Division I sports, (Division I FCS in football). Bucknell's traditional opponents include Lafayette College, Holy Cross, Lehigh University, Colgate University, and American University.

The Bucknell football team won the first Orange Bowl 26–0, over the Miami Hurricanes on January 1, 1935. Bucknell won the first Division II NCAA swimming and diving championships in 1964. It is also the alma mater of baseball pitcher Christy Mathewson, who requested burial in a cemetery adjoining Bucknell's campus.

In 2005, the men's basketball team went to the NCAA men's basketball tournament and became the first Patriot League team to win an NCAA tournament game, upsetting Kansas (64–63). The victory followed a year that included wins over #7 Pittsburgh and Saint Joseph's. They lost to Wisconsin in the following round but received the honor of "Best Upset" at the 2005 ESPY Awards.

Traditions and symbols
On April 17, 1849, the trustees approved the current Bucknell seal. The seal shows the sun, an open book, and waves. The sun symbolizes the light of knowledge while the book represents education surmounting the storms and "waves" of life. Bucknell's colors are orange and blue, being approved by a committee of students in 1887. The bison is the current mascot of Bucknell University. In 1923, Dr. William Bartol suggested the animal due to Bucknell's location in the Buffalo Valley. The school cheer is "'ray Bucknell!"

Student life

Bucknell boasts more than 150 student organizations, a historical downtown cinema (The Campus Theatre), an arts studio and makerspace (7th Street Studio), and a calendar full of visiting speakers, art exhibits, performances, recitals, and year-end celebrations such as the "Chrysalis" ball and dinners sponsored by international student organizations. 

In addition to on-campus activities, historical downtown Lewisburg is a short walk from campus and features a variety of shops, galleries, churches, parks, restaurants, and bars. Bucknell's location in the  Ridge-and-Valley section of the Appalachian Mountains and on the banks of the Susquehanna River afford endless opportunities for outdoor activities made accessible to students through the program for Outdoor Education and Leadership and the BuckWild pre-orientation program. Bucknell's student newspaper, The Bucknellian, is printed weekly. Its radio station is WVBU-FM. Spratt House is the home of the institution's Army Reserve Officer Training Corps (ROTC) program.

Bucknell offers opportunities to engage in religious life on campus through Catholic Campus Ministry, Rooke Chapel Congregation, Muslim Students' Association, and Hillel.

Bucknell has an active Greek life. Students "rush" in the first semester of their sophomore year, and approximately 50% of eligible students join the school's 7 fraternities and 9 sororities. Active fraternities are: Chi Phi, Kappa Alpha Psi, Lambda Chi Alpha, Phi Gamma Delta, Sigma Alpha Epsilon,Sigma Chi, and Sigma Phi Epsilon. Active sororities are: Alpha Chi Omega, Alpha Delta Pi, Alpha Xi Delta, Chi Omega, Delta Gamma, Delta Sigma Theta, Kappa Alpha Theta, Kappa Kappa Gamma, Mu Sigma Upsilon.

Room and board
Bucknell guarantees on-campus housing for four years, and 89% of students choose to live on campus. The university offers a variety of living-learning communities, including affinity houses for black, latinx, and LGTBQ+, and international students as well as those who enjoy outdoor activities, video games, substance free fun. First year students are invited to join a residential colleges, living-learning communities with faculty and student mentorship that are organized around common academic interests including the arts, humanities, languages, society and technology, and social justice.

The campus is roughly divided into "uphill" and "downhill" areas by a large slope between Moore Avenue and Dent Drive. The uphill area flanks U.S. Route 15 and the West Branch Susquehanna River and features many of the academic buildings, including the main academic quadrangle, the observatory, and library as well as some dormitories, Christy Mathewson–Memorial Stadium, and Fraternity Road. Downhill borders the Victorian-era neighborhoods of downtown Lewisburg and features mainly residential buildings, including the majority of first-year dormitories, the Gateway apartment complex, the President's house, many of the indoor athletic facilities, and Hunt Hall, home to the institution's sororities. Bucknell West, which is separated from the rest of campus by Route 15, features housing, athletic fields, art and animal behavior laboratories, and an 18-hole golf course. Many more advanced students live in apartment-style housing in South Campus.   

All on-campus students must purchase a campus meal plan. There are several dining options on campus for students, including the Bostwick Cafeteria, Bison snack bar, and Terrace Room in the Elaine Langone Student Center, the Library and 7th Street cafes. In spring 2012, Bucknell inaugurated its first food truck, the Flying Bison.

Alumni

Alumni of Bucknell University include: Burma's first physician Shaw Loo (1863); National Baseball Hall of Fame pitcher Christy Mathewson (1902); actor Ralph Waite (1952); novelist Philip Roth (1954); billionaire businessman, investor, and philanthropist Ken Langone (1957); actor Edward Herrmann (1965); CBS media executive Leslie Moonves (1971); New York Times best-selling author and pastor of Redeemer Presbyterian in New York City Tim Keller (1972); 2016 Pulitzer Prize winner for poetry, Peter Balakian (1973); longtime New Jersey congressman Rob Andrews (1979); CEO of Lord & Taylor and The Children's Place Jane T. Elfers (1983); entrepreneur and founder of Kiva microlending Jessica Jackley (2000); basketball player Mike Muscala (2013).

References

Further reading
Theiss, Lewis Edwin, Centennial history of Bucknell University: 1846–1946, Grit Publishing Co. Press (1946)
The rise of Bucknell University Oliphant, James Orin, The Rise of Bucknell University] Appleton-Century-Crofts (1965)
Krist, Robert, Bucknell University, Harmony House (1990),

External links

Pictorial history (to 1985)
Bucknell Athletics website

 
Educational institutions established in 1846
Eastern Pennsylvania Rugby Union
Universities and colleges in Union County, Pennsylvania
Patriot League
1846 establishments in Pennsylvania
Liberal arts colleges in Pennsylvania
Private universities and colleges in Pennsylvania